Medialink Group Limited is a content distributor and licensor based in Kowloon, Hong Kong specializing in the distribution of Japanese anime and brand licensing. Its offices are located at Mody Road, Tsim Sha Tsui.

Registered from Hong Kong Companies Registry, Medialink was founded as Medialink International Limited by Lovinia Chiu in March 1994. In 2018, co-founders Lovinia and Noletta Chiu integrated Medialink Entertainment and Medialink Animation International into the Medialink Group, which was listed on the Hong Kong Stock Exchange in 2019.

Anime distribution
Medialink Entertainment handles the content acquisition and distribution of Japanese anime in Southeast Asia, South Asia, Mainland China, Taiwan, Hong Kong, Macau, Micronesia, and Polynesia. The company does not directly release its own properties, but instead selects some anime titles for release on home video through its distribution partners such as Asia Video Publishing in Hong Kong, CaiChang International Multimedia in Taiwan, Dream Express (DEX) and previously Rose Media and Entertainment in Thailand.

In addition, the company also sub-licenses select titles to streaming services and TV stations. In 2018, the company launched a new brand called Ani-One to simulcast new anime titles and distribute older series on their partnered platforms. Its notable clients include Netflix, Animax Asia, iQIYI, Bilibili, Dimsum, and local streaming services in select served regions. It also offers anime contents on its own YouTube channel since October 2019. On 10 April 2021, Medialink announced that they had reached a distribution partnership with Mediacorp, with Medialink titles being made available to stream on meWATCH. On 1 July 2021, Medialink launched a membership program called Ani-One ULTRA to simulcast select titles and old anime series under its Ani-One YouTube channel.

In 2019, Medialink began co-producing and co-funding anime projects.

Notable titles distributed by Medialink
Bleach
Chainsaw Man
Code Geass: Lelouch of the Rebellion
Cardcaptor Sakura
Dr. Stone
The Familiar of Zero
Food Wars!: Shokugeki no Soma
Gintama
Haikyu!!
Horimiya
Jujutsu Kaisen
KonoSuba: God's Blessing on this Wonderful World!
Laid-Back Camp
My Hero Academia
My Teen Romantic Comedy SNAFU
No Game No Life
Overlord
The Promised Neverland (Hong Kong, Macau, and Taiwan only)
To Your Eternity 
Saga of Tanya the Evil 
So I'm a Spider, So What?
Soul Eater
Tokyo Ghoul:re
Yashahime: Princess Half-Demon

Other businesses

Brand licensing
Medialink Animation International manages the brand licensing business. It is involved in the licensing of various brands, including Garfield, Popeye, Betty Boop, The Little Prince, and My Hero Academia.

Ani-Mall
In 2020, Medialink started venturing into the e-commerce business during the COVID-19 pandemic. Launched in August 2020, Ani-Mall is an online store selling anime-themed clothes, toys and other merchandise from Medialink's licensed brands.

Ani-Kids
On 19 September 2020, Medialink launched a new educational entertainment VOD platform on MyTV SUPER for children in preschools.

References

External links

 
 

 
1994 establishments in Hong Kong
Anime companies
Companies listed on the Hong Kong Stock Exchange
Companies of Hong Kong
Entertainment companies of Hong Kong
Hong Kong brands
Kowloon
Mass media companies established in 1994
Mass media companies of Hong Kong
Tsim Sha Tsui